Symphyodontaceae is a moss family in the order Hypnales.

Genera

The family Symphyodontaceae contains the following genera:

Chaetomitriopsis 
Chaetomitrium 
Dimorphocladon 
Rheoshevockia 
Symphyodon 
Trachythecium 
Unclejackia

References

External links

Hypnales
Moss families